The Papua New Guinea women's national rugby sevens team represents Papua New Guinea in international rugby sevens tournaments, particularly the World Rugby Sevens Challenger Series, Oceania Women's Sevens Championship and Pacific Games. PNG's  first international was in 2007 while hosting the first ever Pacific women's sevens championship (now known as Oceania Women's Sevens Championship) in Port Moresby. In 2017, the team participated for the first time in the World Rugby Women's Sevens Series as an invited team at the 2017 Sydney Women's Sevens. Papua New Guinea made its debut at the Women's Sevens World Cup in 2018.

They finished in fourth place at the 2019 Oceania Women's Sevens Championship which earned them a spot at the 2020 Women's Rugby Sevens Final Olympic Qualification Tournament. The Palais did not qualify for the 2020 Tokyo Olympics.

Tournament History
A red box around the year indicates tournaments played within Papua New Guinea

World Cup Sevens results

Olympic Games results

Commonwealth Games results

Pacific Games results

Oceania Women's Sevens results

World Rugby Sevens Challenger Series

Oceania Rugby Sevens Challenger Series

Team

Current squad

Squad to Oceania Challenger Series  in Australia from November 19-20,2022

Alice Alois (c)
Helen Abau
Lynette Aua
Marie Biyama
Joanne Butler 
Tengapai Gigimat
Doreen Kaputin
Naomi Kelly
Gwen Pokana
Cathy Puro
Fatima Rama
Barbara Sigere

Previous squads

In Chile from August 12-14,2022

Alice Alois (c)
Barbara Sigere
Cassandra Sampson
Cathy Puro
Chelsea Garesa
Doreen Kaputin
Emmalyn John
Fatima Rama
Geua Larry
Helen Abau
Joanne Butler 
Marie Biyama
Marie Siari 
Naomi Kelly
Sharon Kobor

Kymlie Rapilla (c)
Helen Abau
Alice Alois
Chelsea Garesa
Fatima Rama
Taiva Lavai
Cathy Puro
Lynette Aua
Geua Larry
Patricia Korpok
Tengapai Esther Gigimat

The Papua New Guinea Rugby Union announced its women's rugby sevens team on 28 June 2019.

Roster

 Cassandra Samson
 Alice Alois
 Amelia Kuk
 Lynette Kwarula
 Trisilla Rema
 Dulcie Bomai
 Menda Ipat
 Freda Waula
 Kymlie Rapilla
 Naomi Alapi
 Geua Larry
 Joanne Lagona

See also
Papua New Guinea women's national rugby union team

References

Women's national rugby sevens teams
Rugby union in Papua New Guinea
W